Stephen Paul Barclay (born 3 May 1972) is a British politician who has served as Secretary of State for Health and Social Care since October 2022 under Rishi Sunak, having previously held the position from July to September 2022 under Boris Johnson. He served as Secretary of State for Exiting the European Union from 2018 to 2020, Chief Secretary to the Treasury from 2020 to 2021, Minister for the Cabinet Office and Chancellor of the Duchy of Lancaster from 2021 to 2022, and Downing Street Chief of Staff from February to July 2022. A member of the Conservative Party, he has been Member of Parliament (MP) for North East Cambridgeshire since 2010.

Born in Lancashire and educated at King Edward VII School, Lytham, Barclay attended the Royal Military Academy Sandhurst and served in the British Army before reading history at Peterhouse, Cambridge. Qualifying as a solicitor from the College of Law, he worked in the financial sector while being active in the Conservative Party and unsuccessfully contesting Manchester Blackley in 1997 and Lancaster and Wyre in 2001. Elected at the 2010 general election, he served as Lord Commissioner of the Treasury from 2016 to 2017 and Economic Secretary to the Treasury from 2017 to 2018. After the 2018 cabinet reshuffle, he became Minister of State for Health.

Barclay was appointed Secretary of State for Exiting the European Union by Theresa May following the resignation of Dominic Raab in November 2018. He was retained in the position by Boris Johnson and remained in office until the United Kingdom officially left the EU on 31 January 2020. Barclay quickly returned to the Cabinet as Chief Secretary to the Treasury in the 2020 cabinet reshuffle. He was later promoted to Chancellor of the Duchy of Lancaster and Minister for the Cabinet Office in the 2021 cabinet reshuffle. In February 2022, Barclay also assumed the responsibilities of the Downing Street Chief of Staff, following the resignation of Dan Rosenfield. In July 2022, he became Secretary of State for Health and Social Care following the resignation of Sajid Javid; he was removed from the position by Johnson's successor Liz Truss in September 2022. In October 2022, following Truss's resignation, he was reappointed to the role by new prime minister Rishi Sunak.

Early life and education
Barclay was brought up in Lancashire.  His father worked in IT for 55 years, during which he was seconded for three years to the company’s Staff Association, which later became the Banking and Insurance Union. His mother worked full-time as a civil service administrator. He is the youngest of three brothers, all of whom played rugby.

Barclay was educated at King Edward VII School, an independent school in Lytham St Annes. After completing his A levels, he joined the British Army on a Gap Year Commission, attended the Royal Military Academy Sandhurst, and served as a Second Lieutenant with the Royal Regiment of Fusiliers for five months. His is the first generation of his family to go to university, and he read history at Peterhouse, Cambridge. He then studied at the College of Law at its Chester campus, to qualify as a solicitor in 1998.

Early career
Barclay completed his training contract as an articled clerk with a large London law firm before working at Axa Insurance, the Financial Services Authority, and Barclays.

Parliamentary career
After leaving university in 1994, Barclay joined the Conservative Party. He was a member of the A-List and was twice an unsuccessful parliamentary candidate, contesting Manchester Blackley in 1997 and Lancaster and Wyre in 2001, coming within 500 votes of winning the latter seat. In 2007, Barclay took over as organiser of the Carlton Club political dinner, which raises funds for the Conservative Party's target seats.

Barclay was selected in January 2008 to replace the outgoing North East Cambridgeshire MP, Malcolm Moss, and was elected at the May 2010 general election with a majority of 16,425. After the election, he was soon elected by fellow MPs to become a member of the Public Accounts Committee, which scrutinises Government spending. ConservativeHome named him as one of a minority of loyal Conservative backbench MPs not to have voted against the Government in any substantive rebellions.

Following the appointment of Theresa May as Prime Minister, Barclay was appointed as a Lord Commissioner of the Treasury. He later joined HM Treasury as Economic Secretary to the Treasury with responsibility for financial services, known as the City Minister in June 2017. In January 2018 he became Minister of State for Health in the Department for Health and Social Care.

Secretary of State for Exiting the European Union
Barclay was appointed as Secretary of State for Exiting the European Union in November 2018 following the resignation of Dominic Raab. It was reported that Barclay would focus on the domestic preparations rather than negotiations for Brexit. He retained his role as Brexit Secretary in Boris Johnson's first and second cabinets. He ceased to be Brexit Secretary at 11:00 pm on 31 January 2020, the moment the Department for Exiting the European Union was closed down as the UK formally left the EU.

Chief Secretary to the Treasury
Barclay was appointed as the Chief Secretary to the Treasury in February 2020, replacing Rishi Sunak who had been appointed Chancellor of the Exchequer following the resignation of Sajid Javid.

In May 2020, Barclay appeared on BBC's Question Time and was corrected by presenter Fiona Bruce about the number of people who had received the Government's COVID-19 testing.

Chancellor of the Duchy of Lancaster and Downing Street Chief of Staff
In a cabinet reshuffle on 15 September 2021, Barclay succeeded Michael Gove as Chancellor of the Duchy of Lancaster and Minister for the Cabinet Office.

On 5 February 2022, Barclay was appointed by Johnson as his new Chief of Staff, following the resignation of Dan Rosenfield. He is the first serving MP to hold this position. He said he would pursue a "smaller state" in his new role. Barclay ceased to hold either office after his appointment as Secretary of State for Health and Social Care.

Health Secretary

First term (2022)
On 5 July 2022, Barclay was appointed Health Secretary after Sajid Javid's resignation on 3 July. According to the editor of the Health Service Journal "never has a politician arrived in the post of health secretary trailing a worse reputation among NHS leaders".

On 6 September 2022, Barclay left the government and returned to the backbenches.

Second term (2022–present)
He was reappointed by Rishi Sunak when he became prime minister on 25 October 2022. Chief Executive Officer of the NHS Confederation, Matthew Taylor, declared "Mr Barclay would do well to remember that he is taking on one of the most efficient healthcare systems in the world".

Personal life
Barclay and his wife Karen have a son and a daughter. Barclay is a rugby fan.

References

External links
 
Profile at the Conservative Party

1972 births
Alumni of Peterhouse, Cambridge
Chancellors of the Duchy of Lancaster
Conservative Party (UK) MPs for English constituencies
Downing Street Chiefs of Staff
Economic Secretaries to the Treasury
Graduates of the Royal Military Academy Sandhurst
Living people
Members of the Privy Council of the United Kingdom
People educated at King Edward VII and Queen Mary School
People from Lytham St Annes
Royal Regiment of Fusiliers officers
Secretaries of State for Exiting the European Union
UK MPs 2010–2015
UK MPs 2015–2017
UK MPs 2017–2019
UK MPs 2019–present
Secretaries of State for Health and Social Care
Chief Secretaries to the Treasury